Moradabad, Delfan may refer to:

Moradabad, Khaveh-ye Jonubi
Moradabad, Nurabad
Moradabad-e Gol Gol
Moradabad-e Mirakhur
Moradabad-e Pirdusti
Moradabad Nurali